The John Philip Sousa Foundation is a non-profit foundation dedicated to the promotion of band music internationally.  The foundation administers a number of projects and awards supporting high quality band performance, conducting, and composition.

The foundation is named for John Philip Sousa, a prominent composer of American band music in the late 19th and early 20th centuries.  Successor to the Sousa Memorial Committee, the organization was reorganized as the John Philip Sousa Foundation in 1980 with support from Louis Sudler, a Chicago real estate developer and arts patron for whom many of the foundation's awards are named.

Projects
Projects of the Sousa Foundation include funding for the main stage at the Kennedy Center in Washington, D.C., honor bands, conducting competitions, awards for outstanding performing ensembles, and bringing attention to historic sites in band history.  Many of the foundation's awards are funded through an endowment from Louis and Virginia Sudler, and are collectively known as the "Louis Sudler Awards of Merit".

The Sousa National High School Honors Band
Founded in 1981, the Sousa National High School Honors Band is an ensemble made up of roughly 100 high school junior and senior musicians, selected from the top applicants worldwide. The band performs semi-regularly at a variety of locations around the United States.

The Sudler Flag of Honor
The Sudler Flag of Honor is an award bestowed to identify, recognize and honor high school band programs internationally that have demonstrated particularly significant high standards of excellence in concert activities over a period of several years.  No school may win the award twice under the same director. The official description of a deserving band is:

The band must have achieved and maintained a high standard of excellence in the concert area over a period of several years. The concert band will have placed itself in situations where there has been opportunity for evaluation by qualified persons or has been rated "superior" at state, regional, or national levels in concert activities. The band program must offer its participants a complete and balanced program of musical activities including concert, solo, ensemble, and marching areas. The band should have performed at regional, state, national, and professional meetings of significance. These can include but are not limited to state music conventions, regional or national MENC meetings, and state or national band association conventions. The director must have been incumbent in his/her position for at least seven years, including the current year. A number of the students in the band should have participated in district and all-state honor bands or similar all-area groups.

The Sudler Flag of Honor is typically considered to be the highest award a high school band can achieve.  Sudler Flag laureate bands are automatically included on the Historic Roll of Honor. The following are the recipients of the Sudler Flag since its inception in 1983:

 1983 - Alice High School Band, Alice, Texas
 1983 - L. D. Bell High School Band, Hurst, Texas
 1983 - Georgetown High School Band, Georgetown, Texas
 1983 - North Hills High School Band, Pittsburgh, Pennsylvania
 1983 - Papillion-La Vista Senior High School Band, Papillion, Nebraska
 1983 - Richardson High School Band, Richardson, Texas
 1983 - Wheat Ridge High School Band, Wheat Ridge, Colorado
 1984 - Lloyd V. Berkner High School Band, Richardson, Texas
 1984 - Glenbard East High School Band, Lombard, Illinois
 1984 - Hardaway High School Band, Columbus, Georgia
 1984 - Reynoldsburg High School Band, Reynoldsburg, Ohio
 1984 - Oconomowoc High School Band, Oconomowoc, Wisconsin
 1985 - Clear Lake High School Band, Houston, Texas
 1985 - Grand Ledge High School Band, Grand Ledge, Michigan
 1985 - South Lakes High School Band, Reston, Virginia
 1985 - Stevens High School Band, Rapid City, South Dakota
 1985 - Valparaiso High School Band, Valparaiso, Indiana
 1986 - J.J. Pearce High School Band, Richardson, Texas
 1986 - Lakeland High School Band, Lakeland, Florida
 1987 - Auburn High School Band, Auburn, Alabama
 1987 - Lake Highlands High School Band, Dallas, Texas
 1988 - Duncanville High School Band, Duncanville, Texas
 1988 - Lassiter High School Band, Marietta, Georgia
 1988 - Mason City High School Band, Mason City, Iowa
 1989 - Coronado High School Band, El Paso, Texas
 1989 - James Madison High School Band, Vienna, Virginia
 1989 - Sumter High School Band, Sumter, South Carolina
 1990 - Herndon High School Band, Herndon, Virginia
 1991 - Marian Catholic High School Band, Chicago Heights, Illinois
 1991 - Pearl City High School Band, Pearl City, Hawaii
 1991 - Robert E. Lee High School Band, Midland, Texas
 1992 - J.W. Robinson High School Band, Fairfax, Virginia
 1993 - Lakeland High School Band, Lakeland, Florida
 1993 - George C. Marshall High School Band, Falls Church, Virginia
 1994 - Clements High School Band, Sugar Land, Texas
 1994 - Lake Braddock Secondary School Band, Burke, Virginia
 1994 - The Colony High School Band, The Colony, Texas
 1994 - Westfield High School Band, Houston, Texas
 1995 - W.T. Woodson High School Band, Fairfax, Virginia
 1995 - Spring High School Band, Spring, Texas
 1996 - Norcross High School Band, Norcross, Georgia
 1997 - Klein Forest High School Band, Houston, Texas
 1997 - Langham Creek High School Band, Houston, Texas
 1997 - Owasso High School Band, Owasso, Oklahoma
 1997 - Westmoore High School Band, Oklahoma City, Oklahoma
 1998 - Jack C. Hays High School Band, Buda, Texas
 1998 - Westlake High School Band, Austin, Texas
 1999 - Irmo High School Band, Irmo, South Carolina
 2000 - Leon High School Band, Tallahassee, Florida
 2000 - J.J. Pearce High School Band, Richardson, Texas
 2000 - McLean High School Band, McLean, Virginia
 2002 - Buchholz High School Band, Gainesville, Florida
 2003 - North Hardin High School Band, Radcliff, Kentucky
 2003 - The Woodlands High School Band, The Woodlands, Texas
 2004 - Dobyns-Bennett High School Band, Kingsport, Tennessee
 2004 - Lloyd V. Berkner High School Band, Richardson, Texas
 2005 - J.W. Robinson High School Band, Fairfax, Virginia
 2005 - Parkview High School Band, Lilburn, Georgia
 2006 - Friendswood High School Band, Friendswood, Texas
 2006 - Cypress Falls High School Band, Houston, Texas
 2006 - Harrison High School Band, Kennesaw, Georgia
 2007 - Wando High School Band, Mt. Pleasant, South Carolina
 2007 - John Hersey High School Band, Arlington Heights, Illinois
 2008 - William Mason High School Band, Mason, Ohio
 2008 - Lockport Township High School Band, Lockport, Illinois
 2008 - Poteet High School Band, Mesquite, Texas
 2008 - Permian High School Band, Odessa, Texas
 2009 - Neuqua Valley High School Band, Naperville, Illinois
 2010 - None selected
 2011 - James Madison High School Band, Vienna, Virginia
 2011 - Hebron High School Band, Carrollton, Texas
 2011 - W.T. Woodson High School Band, Fairfax, Virginia 
 2012 - Roxbury High School Band, Succasunna, New Jersey
 2013 - Marcus High School Band, Flower Mound, Texas
 2014 - Lafayette High School Band, Lexington, Kentucky
 2015 - Midlothian High School Band, Midlothian, Texas
 2015 - Plano East Senior High School Band, Plano, Texas
 2016 - Brazoswood High School Band, Clute, Texas
 2017 - Lake Braddock Secondary School Band, Burke, Virginia
 2017 - McLean High School Band, McLean, Virginia
 2019 - Crosby High School Band, Crosby, Texas
 2019 - Hikarigaoka Girls' High School Wind Orchestra, Okazaki, Aichi
 2020 - Vandegrift High School Band, Austin, Texas
 2021 - Mansfield Summit High School Band, Arlington, Texas
 2021 - Vista Ridge High School Band, Cedar Park, Texas

The Sudler Cup

The Sudler Cup is an award bestowed to identify, recognize and honor junior high and middle school concert band programs that have demonstrated particularly significant high standards of excellence in concert activities over a period of several years. The official description of a deserving band is:

The band must have achieved and maintained a high standard of literature in the concert area over a period of several years. The concert band will have placed itself in situations where there has been opportunity for evaluation by qualified persons or has been rated "superior" at state, regional, or national levels in concert activities. The band should have performed at regional, state, national, and professional meetings of significance. These can include but are not limited to state music conventions, regional or national MENC meetings, and state or national band association conventions. The director must have been incumbent in his/her position for at least seven years, including the current year. A number of the students in the band should have participated in district and all-state honor bands or similar all-area groups. The total program of music should exemplify what is considered a sound viable, music education program for this level of endeavor.

The following are the recipients of the Sudler Cup since its inception in 1985:

 1985 - Morehead Junior High, El Paso, Texas
 1985 - Asheville Junior High, Asheville, North Carolina
 1985 - Gunn Junior High, Arlington, Texas
 1985 - Oconomowoc Junior High, Oconomowoc, Wisconsin
 1986 - Adamson Junior High, Rex, Georgia
 1986 - Southwest Junior High, Lakeland, Florida
 1987 - Morrow Junior High, Morrow, Georgia 
 1988 - Scottsbluff Junior High, Scottsbluff, Nebraska
 1989 - Richardson North Jr. High, Richardson, Texas
 1989 - David Crockett Junior High, Odessa, Texas
 1990 - Murchison Middle School, Austin, Texas 
 1990 - Thoreau Intermediate School, Vienna, Virginia
 1990 - Westwood Junior High, Dallas, Texas
 1992 - McAdams Middle School, Dickinson, Texas 
 1992 - Wm. Adams Junior High, Alice, Texas
 1993 - Highlands Intermediate School, Pearl City, Hawaii
 1993 - Hodges Bend Middle School, Houston, Texas
 1994 - DeSoto West Middle School, DeSoto, Texas
 1994 - Pittman Middle School, Hueytown, Alabama 
 1995 - Prairie Middle School, Hutchinson, Kansas
 1995 - Herndon Middle School, Herndon, Virginia
 1997 - Nimitz Jr. High School, Odessa, Texas
 1997 - Robinson Middle School, Fairfax, Virginia
 1997 - The Colony Middle School, The Colony, Texas
 1999 - Longfellow Middle School, Falls Church, Virginia
 2000 - Irmo Middle School, Columbia, South Carolina
 2000 - Space Center Intermediate School, Houston, Texas
 2001 - Gordon A. Bailey Middle School, Austin, Texas
 2001 - Robert Frost Middle School, Fairfax, Virginia
 2001 - Lake Braddock Secondary School, Burke, Virginia
 2002 - First Colony Middle School, Sugar Land, Texas
 2003 - Coyle Middle School, Rowlett, Texas
 2003 - Grisham Middle School, Austin, Texas
 2004 - North Ridge Middle School, N Richmond, Texas
 2004 - Holub Middle School, Houston, Texas
 2005 - L.J Alleman Middle School, Lafayette, Louisiana
 2005 - Cooper Middle School, McLean, Virginia
 2006 - Oliver McCracken Middle School, Skokie, Illinois
 2007 - Cedar Park Middle School, Cedar Park, Texas
 2008 - Fort Settlement Middle School, Sugar Land, Texas
 2010 - Artie Henry Middle School, Cedar Park, Texas
 2010 - Forbes Middle School, Georgetown, Texas
 2010 - Space Center Intermediate School, Houston, Texas
 2011 - Kealing Middle School Wind Ensemble, Austin, Texas
 2012 - Fort Clarke Middle School Symphonic Band, Gainesville, Florida
 2012 - West Ridge Middle School Wind Ensemble Band, Austin, Texas
 2013 - Indian Springs Middle School Band, Keller, Texas
 2014 - Rice Middle School Wind Ensemble, Plano, Texas
 2016 - Adelle R. Clark Middle School Band, Frisco, Texas
 2017 - Canyon Ridge Middle School, Austin, Texas
 2017 - Cockrill Middle School, McKinney, Texas
 2017 - Riverwatch Middle School, Suwanee, Georgia
 2017 - Shadow Ridge Middle School, Flower Mound, Texas
 2018 - TA Howard Middle School Middle School, Mansfield, Texas
 2019 - Arbor Creek Middle School, Carrollton, Texas
 2021 - Cooper Middle School, Fairfax County, Virginia

Sudler Trophy

The Sudler Trophy is an award bestowed on one university marching band. It was awarded annually from 1982 to 2007 and biannually since then.  Described by a Los Angeles Times reporter as "[t]he Heisman Trophy of the collegiate band world", the award does not represent the winner of any championship, but rather a band surrounded by great tradition that has become respected nationally.  No school may be honored with the award twice.  According to the official description of the trophy:
The purpose of the Sudler Trophy is to identify and recognize collegiate marching bands of particular excellence who have made outstanding contributions to the American way of life. The Sudler Trophy is awarded annually to a college or university marching band which has demonstrated the highest musical standards and innovative marching routines and ideas, and which has made important contributions to the advancement of the performance standards of college marching bands over a period of years. The trophy measures exactly  from the base to the tip of the drum major's mace; precisely the size of a standard 8 to 5 step in marching.

The following are the recipients of the Sudler Trophy since its inception in 1982:

The Sudler Shield
The Sudler Shield recognizes outstanding high school marching bands.

The following are the recipients of the Sudler Shield:
 1987 - Enterprise High School, Enterprise, Alabama
 1987 - Federal Hocking High School, Stewart, Ohio
 1987 - Mountain Crest High School, Hyrum, Utah
 1987 - Tenri Seminary High School, Nara, Nara, Japan
 1988 - Cambridge High School, Cambridge, Ohio
 1988 - Clovis High School, Clovis, California
 1988 - John Overton High School, Nashville, Tennessee
 1989 - Grove City High School, Grove City, Ohio 
 1989 - Mills E. Godwin High School, Richmond, Virginia
 1989 - Manzano High School, Albuquerque, New Mexico
 1989 - Mt. Juliet High School, Mount Juliet, Tennessee
 1989 - Neuces Canyon High School, Barksdale, Texas
 1989 - Newton High School, Pleasant Hill, Ohio
 1989 - Norwin High School, North Huntingdon Township, Pennsylvania
 1990 - Clinton High School, Clinton, Mississippi
 1991 - Lafayette High School, Lexington, Kentucky
 1992 - Coronado High School Band, El Paso, Texas
 1992 - John Overton High School, Nashville, Tennessee
 1992 - North Hardin High School, Radcliff, Kentucky
 1992 - Pope High School, Marietta, Georgia
 1993 - Fred C. Beyer High School, Modesto, California
 1993 - Sumter High School, Sumter, South Carolina
 1994 - McGavock High School, Nashville, Tennessee
 1996 - Paul Laurence Dunbar High School, Lexington, Kentucky
 1997 - Marian Catholic High School, Chicago Heights, Illinois
 1998 - Duncanville High School, Duncanville, Texas
 1998 - Lafayette High School, Lexington, Kentucky
 1998 - Lassiter High School, Marietta, Georgia
 1998 - Pupuk Kaltim School, Bontang, Kaltim, Indonesia
 1999 - Broken Arrow High School, Broken Arrow, Oklahoma
 1999 - Harrison County High School, Cynthiana, Kentucky
 1999 - Westfield High School, Houston, Texas
 2000 - Aimachi Marching Band, Handa, Aichi, Japan
 2000 - Lawrence Central High School, Indianapolis, Indiana
 2001 - James F. Byrnes High School, Duncan, South Carolina
 2002 - Kashiwa City High School, Kashiwa, Chiba, Japan
 2002 - Kennesaw Mountain High School, Kennesaw, Georgia
 2002 - Yokohama Marching Band, Yokohama, Japan
 2003 - Allen High School, Allen, Texas
 2003 - Seminole High School, Seminole, Florida
 2004 - Collins Hill High School, Suwanee, Georgia
 2004 - L.D. Bell High School, Hurst, Texas
 2004 - Owasso High School, Owasso, Oklahoma
 2005 - James Bowie High School, Austin, Texas 
 2005 - Show and Marchingband Kunst & Genoegen, Leiden, Netherlands
 2005 - Paul Laurence Dunbar High School, Lexington, Kentucky
 2005 - Ronald Reagan High School, San Antonio, Texas 
 2006 - Cedar Park High School, Cedar Park, Texas
 2006 - Langham Creek High School, Houston, Texas
 2007 - Avon High School, Avon, Indiana
 2007 - Marcus High School, Flower Mound, Texas
 2008 - Broken Arrow High School, Broken Arrow, Oklahoma
 2008 - Coppell High School, Coppell, Texas
 2008 - Musica Grato High School, Himi, Toyama, Japan
 2008 - Tarpon Springs High School, Tarpon Springs, Florida
 2009 - American Fork High School, American Fork, Utah
 2009 - Chonkanyanukoon High School, Amphur Muang, Chomburi, Thailand
 2009 - Walton High School, Marietta, Georgia
 2009 - The Woodlands High School, The Woodlands, Texas
 2010 - Hebron High School, Carrollton, Texas
 2010 - Westlake High School, Austin, Texas
 2011 - Sultanah Asma Marching Band, Kedah, Malaysia
 2011 - Homestead High School, Fort Wayne, Indiana
 2011 - William Mason High School, Mason, Ohio
 2012 - Carmel High School, Carmel, Indiana
 2012 - Plano East Senior High School, Plano, Texas
 2013 - Blue Springs High School, Blue Springs, Missouri
 2013 - Calgary Stampede Showband, Calgary, Alberta
 2013 - James Bowie High School, Austin, Texas 
 2013 - Kanagawa Prefecture Shonandai High School, Fujisawa, Kanagawa, Japan
 2014 - Claudia Taylor Johnson High School, San Antonio, Texas
 2014 - Dobyns-Bennett High School, Kingsport, Tennessee
 2014 - Franklin High School, Franklin, Tennessee
 2014 - Round Rock High School, Round Rock, Texas
 2015 - Broken Arrow High School, Broken Arrow, Oklahoma
 2015 - Keller High School, Keller, Texas
 2016 - Castle High School, Newburgh, Indiana
 2016 - Chien Kuo Senior High School, Taipei City, Taiwan
 2016 - Keat Hwa Secondary School, Alor Setar, Kedah, Malaysia 
 2016 - Russell County High School, Russell Springs, Kentucky
 2016 - Vista Murrieta High School, Murrieta, California
 2017 - Flower Mound High School, Flower Mound, Texas
 2017 - Greendale High School, Greendale, Wisconsin
 2017 - Morton High School, Morton, Illinois
 2017 - Vista Ridge High School, Cedar Park, Texas
 2018 - Adair County High School, Columbia, Kentucky
 2018 - Carmel High School, Carmel, Indiana
 2018 - North Lamar High School, Paris, Texas
 2018 - The Woodlands High School, The Woodlands, Texas
 2019 - Mineola High School, Mineola, Texas
 2019 - Vandegrift High School, Austin, Texas
 2021 - Brownsburg High School, Brownsburg, Indiana
 2021 - Southlake Carroll High School, Southlake, Texas
 2021 - Wakeland High School, Frisco, Texas
 2021 - Murray High School (Kentucky), Murray, Kentucky
 2022 - William Mason High School, Mason, Ohio
 2022 - Fishers High School, Fishers, Indiana
 2022 - Beechwood High School, Fort Mitchell, Kentucky
 2022 - Anderson County High School (Kentucky), Lawrenceburg, Kentucky
 2022 - Door Vriendschap Sterk, Katwijk, Netherlands

The Sudler Silver Scroll
The Sudler Scroll recognizes and honors those community bands that have demonstrated particularly high standards of excellence in concert activities over a period of several years, and which have played a significant and leading role in the cultural and musical environment in their respective communities.

Those community concert bands which have won the award include:
 Northshore Concert Band, Evanston, Illinois (1987)
 Lawrence City Band, Lawrence, Kansas (1988)
 Kiel Municipal Band, Kiel, Wisconsin (1990)
 Tacoma Concert Band, Tacoma, Washington (1990)
 Allentown Band, Allentown, Pennsylvania (1990)
 Naperville Municipal Band, Naperville, Illinois (1991)
 Sarasota Mobile Home Band, Sarasota, Florida (1993)
 Austin Symphonic Band, Austin, Texas (1993)
 Racine Municipal Band, Racine, Wisconsin (1994)
 Lansing Concert Band, Lansing, Michigan (1994)
 Texas Wind Symphony, Arlington, Texas (1995)
 Medalist Concert Band, Bloomington, Minnesota (1995)
 Kent Stark Concert Band, Canton, Ohio (1996)
 Scottsdale Concert Band, Scottsdale, Arizona (1996)
 Ridgewood Concert Band, Ridgewood, New Jersey (1996)
 Tara Winds Concert Band, Hampton, Georgia (1996)
 Coastal Communities Concert Band, San Diego, California (1997)
 Lakeland Civic Band, Kirtland, Ohio (1997)
 Twin City Concert Band, West Monroe, Louisiana (1997)
 San Jose Wind Symphony, San Jose, California (1998)
 Corpus Christi Wind Symphony, Corpus Christi, Texas (1998)
 Community Band of Brevard, Brevard County, Florida (1999)
 Lafayette Concert Band, Lafayette, Louisiana (1999)
 Virginia Grand Military Band, Arlington, Virginia (2000)
 Allentown Band, Allentown, Pennsylvania (1990)
 Lafayette Citizens Band, Lafayette, Indiana (2001)
 Pensacola Civic Band, Pensacola, Florida (2002)
 Tempe Wind Ensemble, Tempe, Arizona (2002)
 Atlanta Wind Symphony, Atlanta, Georgia (2003)
 Houston Symphonic Band, Houston, Texas (2003)
 Penn Central Wind Band, Lewisburg, Pennsylvania (2004)
 City of Fairfax Band, Fairfax, Virginia (2004)
 West Michigan Winds, Muskegon, Michigan (2005)
 Knightwind Ensemble, Milwaukee, Wisconsin (2005)
 South Jersey Area Wind Ensemble, Egg Harbor Township, New Jersey (2006)
 Oregon Symphonic Band, Portland, Oregon (2007)
 Tennessee Concert Band, Knoxville, Tennessee (2007)
 East Winds Symphonic Band, Pittsburgh, Pennsylvania (2008)
 Minnesota Symphonic Winds, Edina, Minnesota (2009)
 Cobb Wind Symphony, Marietta, Georgia (2009)
 Savannah River Winds, North Augusta, South Carolina (2010)
 Virginia Wind Symphony, Norfolk, Virginia (2011)
 Lone Star Symphonic Band, Houston, Texas (2012)
 Lake Oswego Millennium Concert Band, Lake Oswego, Oregon (2013)
 Concord Band, Concord, Massachusetts (2013)							 
 East Texas Symphonic Band, Longview, Texas (2014)
 Metropolitan Wind Symphony, Boston, Massachusetts (2015)				
 Sierra Nevada Wind Orchestra, Gold River, California (2015)
 Montgomery County Concert Band, Hatfield, Pennsylvania (2017)
 Waukesha Area Symphonic Band, Oconomowoc, Wisconsin (2017)
 Carrollton Wind Symphony, Frisco, Texas (2017)
 Buffalo Niagara Concert Band, Buffalo, New York (2018)
 Fairfax Wind Symphony, Fairfax, Virginia (2019)
 The Woodlands Concert Band, The Woodlands, Texas (2021)
 The Heart of Texas Concert Band, San Antonio, Texas (2022)

The Sudler International Composition Competition 
The Sudler International Composition Competition is a biennial competition for wind band composition.

The following are the winners of the competition since its inception in 1983:

Sousa/Ostwald Award

References

External links
The John Philip Sousa Foundation
John Philip Sousa Foundation (Loyola University New Orleans)
Sudler Trophy Pamphlet from 2002

Arts foundations based in the United States
Foundation
Charities based in Indiana
Lafayette, Indiana
Organizations established in 1980